Robyn Driscoll was a Democratic Party member of the Montana State Senate. She represented District 26 and then District 25. She was first elected to the Senate in 2012. Robyn Driscoll was formerly a member of the Montana House of Representatives, representing District 51 from 2005 to 2013. She has served in the 2005, 2007, 2009, 2011, 2013, and 2015 legislative sessions.

Driscoll served as a Minority Whip in the Senate during the 2015-2016 session.

References

External links
Official MT Senate Campaign Website
Montana House of Representatives - Robyn Driscoll official MT State Legislature website
Driscoll Equates Constitution Supporters to Terrorist Tim McVeigh 
Project Vote Smart - Representative Robyn Driscoll (MT) profile
Follow the Money - Robyn Driscoll
2008 2006 2004 Montana House campaign contributions

|-

|-

1962 births
21st-century American politicians
21st-century American women politicians
Living people
Democratic Party members of the Montana House of Representatives
Rocky Mountain College alumni
Women state legislators in Montana
State political party chairs of Montana